Dewan Mohammad Azraf  (1908–1999) was a Bengali philosopher, teacher, author, politician, journalist and activist. In 1993, he was honoured as a National Professor in Bangladesh. He was also a supporter of the Bengali Language Movement. For his support of the movement, he was dismissed from the post of the principal of Sunamganj College in 1954, the same year he was promoted to the post. His support was particularly influential when he edited the Nao Belal in 1948. He was actively involved with Kaikobad Sahitya Majlish (1972–99).

Influenced by the thought of Muhammad Iqbal, he has been described as "a prolific writer" who "produced sixty monographs, over 1,000 articles in Bangla and English, 109 novels, poems, songs, and ninety short stories. His works range from literature, arts, music, and religion to philosophy."

Early life
Azraf was born on 1 January 1908 into Teghoria, Sunamganj, Eastern Bengal and Assam, British Raj in his maternal grandfather's home. He completed his schooling at the Middle English School in Duhalia. He passed BA with distinction from Murari Chand College, Sylhet in 1930 and received MA in Philosophy from the University of Dhaka in 1932. As a college student, he was able get Kazi Nazrul Islam to visit Sylhet.

Career 
Azraf joined Sunamganj College as a teacher in 1948 and principal in 1954. He was dismissed from college for supporting the Bengali Language Movement. After his dismissal from Sunamganj College, he taught at various colleges. In 1967, he was appointed the principal of Abujar Gifari College in Dhaka, where he served till 1980. He taught part-time at the departments of Philosophy and Islamic Studies of the University of Dhaka from 1973 to 1990.

A supporter of Abdul Hamid Khan Bhasani, he joined the Muslim League in 1946 in protest of the treatment of Muslim immigrants in Assam, and afterward was elected to the Assam Provincial Committee. He also served 10 months of a prison sentence for violation of Section 144. He helped the formation of the Kendriya Muslim Sahitya Sangsad unit in Sylhet and served as its president from 1940 to 1943. He was a member, as well as a treasurer for some time, of the Pakistan Philosophical Congress. From 1984 to 1989, he served as the president of the Bangladesh Philosophical Association.

Death 
Azraf died on November 1, 1999.

Bibliography
Some of his notable publications include:

Bengali
Jībôn sômôsyār sômādhāne Islām (Islam as a solution to problems in life), articles on Islamic doctrines
Hāsôn Rājā, 1854-1922, study of the life and works of the famous Bengali poet Hason Raja
Sileṭe Islām (Islam in Sylhet), study on the advent and spread of Islam in Sylhet District, Bangladesh
Ithihāse upekkhita ekṭi côritrô. Hashrata Ābuzôr Gifārīr jībônālekkhā o bôiplôbik kôrmadhārā (A neglected character in history), on the Islamic figure of Abu Dhar al-Ghifari 
Itihāser dhārā, on the history of philosophy
Dhôrmô o dôrśôn (Religion and philosophy), essays on philosophy
Sonā jhôrā dinguli , autobiography depicting the author's vast experience of life
Kôbir dôrśôn, articles, mainly on Sir Muhammad Iqbal
Bôktitter bikash, on self-improvement and psychology
Tômôdduner bikash
Sôtyer sôinik abuzor (Soldier of Truth Abu Dhar), on Abu Dhar al-Ghifari 
Nôtun Surjô (New Sun), storybook
Islami andolôn juge juge (Islamic movements by era)
Islam o manôbôtabad (Islam and humanism)
Sôndhani dristite islam
Amader jatiyôtabad (Our nationalism)
Otit jibôner smriti (Memories of past life)
Nôya zindegi (New life), novel
Bigyan o dôrshôn (Science and philosophy)

English
The back-ground of the culture of Muslim Bengal
Science and revelation
Philosophy of history
Islamic movement : its origin, growth and development

Awards
 Independence Day Award
 Ekushey Padak (1992)
 International Muslim Solidarity Prize
 Islamic Foundation Prize
 Srijnan Atish Dipankar Prize

Trivia
The husband of Azraf's granddaughter, Baraheen - Mohammed Salahuddin Chowdhury, was killed in the 9/11 terror attacks. he was working in the twin towers.

References 

Bangladeshi philosophers
Bangladeshi male novelists
Academic staff of the University of Dhaka
University of Dhaka alumni
National Professors of Bangladesh
Recipients of the Independence Day Award
Recipients of the Ekushey Padak
Honorary Fellows of Bangla Academy
1908 births
1999 deaths
Murari Chand College alumni
Iqbal scholars
People from Sunamganj District
20th-century philosophers
20th-century Bengalis
People from Sylhet Division